Sarenga is a census town in Sankrail CD Block of Howrah Sadar subdivision in Howrah district in the Indian state of West Bengal. It is a part of Kolkata Urban Agglomeration.

Geography

Demographics
As per 2011 Census of India Sarenga had a total population of 25,200 of which 12,798 (51%) were males and 12,402 (49%) were females. Population below 6 years was 3,085. The total number of literates in Sarenga was 17,041 (77.06% of the population over 6 years).

Sarenga was part of Kolkata Urban Agglomeration in 2011 census.

 India census, Sarenga had a population of 21,621. Males constitute 51% of the population and females 49%. Sarenga has an average literacy rate of 59%, lower than the national average of 59.5%: male literacy is 64% and female literacy is 54%. In Sarenga, 12% of the population is under 6 years of age.

Transport

Bus
 Sarenga (Kolatala More) - New Town Unitech

Train
Abada railway station on Howrah-Kharagpur line is the nearest railway station.

References

Cities and towns in Howrah district
Neighbourhoods in Kolkata
Kolkata Metropolitan Area